John Zemanek (1921 - April 18, 2016) was an American architect. He taught at the University of Houston beginning in 1964 and was a Fellow of the American Institute of Architects (FAIA), a distinguished educator, and architect.

References

External links
 Interview with John Zemanek 2013 William R. Jenkins Architecture and Art Library, University of Houston Digital Library.

2016 deaths
University of Houston faculty
1921 births